K. M. M. Metha was an Indian politician who served as a Member of the Legislative Assembly of Tamil Nadu. He was elected to the Tamil Nadu legislative assembly as a Dravida Munnetra Kazhagam candidate from Periyakulam constituency in the 1967 elections.

References 

Dravida Munnetra Kazhagam politicians
1926 births
2013 deaths
Tamil Nadu MLAs 1967–1972
People from Theni district